Union sportive de la médina d'Alger (basketball) (Arabic: الإتحاد الرياضي لمدينة الجزائر لكرة السلة), referred to as USM Alger BK for a short, is a basketball club based in Algiers, Algeria that played in the Algerian Basketball Championship the team founded in 1942.

History
USM Alger was the most famous Algerian club basketball after independence, the team won the league title three times, adding the team's arrival two to the Algerian cup final in 1989 and 1996 and the defeat against the best clubs of basketball in Algeria MC Alger and WA Boufarik respectively, currently plays in the second division last time the team was in the first division was the 2012-2013 season, the women's team has the completion of the sole title of the Algerian cup in 1986

In the Algerian Basketball Cup season 2014–15 the USM Alger withdrew from the Round of 16 against Olympique Batna. and in the season of 2016–17, the USMA managed to return to the Super division A after he finished first in the playoffs in the group included ESB Ouargla, MC Saida and OS Bordj Bou Arréridj. under the leadership of the young coach Reda Saiak the Red and Black, who finish the tournament at the top of the standings, thus find the elite four years after their relegation.

Honours

Men's
 Algerian Basketball Championship
Champion (3): 1965–66, 1966–67 and 1968–69
 Algerian Basketball Cup
Runner-up (2): 1988–89, 1995-96

 Roster (Men) Algerian Basketball Championship Champion

 1965–66 Houbi, Lamari, Chakir, Zenir (2), Taitouche, Chaour, Zenir (1), Abderrahmani, Chaoui, Zirmi (1), Eermi (2).
 1966–67 Houbi, Lamari, Zenir (1), Zenir (2), Zirmi, Benhaddad, Abderrahmani, Bonischot , Chakir, Taibouche.
 1968–69 Houbi, Chaour, Lamari, Zenir, Bourrouag, Zioui, Bonischot, Chachoua.

Women's
 Algerian Women's Basketball Championship
Champion (3): 1968–69, 1985–86 and 1990–91
 Algerian Women's Basketball Cup
winners (2): 1978–79 and 1985–86
Runner-up (4): 1986–87, 1989-90, 1990-91, 1992-93

Roster (Men)

Statistics

Season by season

References

External links
 Non Official Site
 basketball.afrobasket.com

Basketball
Basketball teams in Algeria
Sport in Algiers
Basketball teams established in 1942
1942 establishments in Algeria